Pragati College of Engineering and Management (PCEM) was an engineering college located in Raipur, Chhattisgarh, India. The college is affiliated to the Chhattisgarh Swami Vivekanand Technical University and approved by All India Council of Technical Education (AICTE), New Delhi.

Academics
PCEM offered four-year undergraduate programmes leading to the degree of Bachelor of Engineering (BE) in
 Civil Engineering
 Mechanical Engineering
 Computer Science Engineering
 Electronic and Telecommunication Engineering
 Electrical & Electronics Engineering

Rajeev Vora is Director of PCEM. In 2017, Pragati College of Engineering and Management has not accepted any admission and issued No Objection Notice to Chhattisgarh Swami Vivekanand Technical University to close the college.

References

External links
 Official Website
 Institute information on Directorate of Technical Education's website  

Engineering colleges in Chhattisgarh
Education in Raipur, Chhattisgarh